Metarctia flavicincta is a moth of the subfamily Arctiinae. It was described by Per Olof Christopher Aurivillius in 1900 and is found in Angola, Burundi, the Democratic Republic of the Congo, Ethiopia, Ghana, Kenya, Rwanda, Sudan, Tanzania and Uganda.

References

 Arctiidae genus list at Butterflies and Moths of the World of the Natural History Museum

Metarctia
Moths described in 1900